FunTrivia is a trivia website. It was the first trivia website added to the Yahoo directory and used to be the largest trivia site on the web in terms of traffic. It was one of the first entertainment sites on the web to use a community-generated content model to create all of its content.

It contains over one million trivia questions in over one hundred and forty thousand quizzes categorized into nearly sixteen thousand topics, all submitted by over four thousand different contributors. Quizzes are created and submitted by members of the community and placed online for anyone to play for free.

New submissions are checked by category editors before being published, and prior accepted submissions may be modified without editor intervention. All editors on FunTrivia are volunteer community members. As of 2009, there are 40 volunteer editors maintaining the site's content.

FunTrivia also pioneered the "Ask a Question" model in early 2000, in which visitors could ask a trivia question and receive answers from other guests.

User Features

Free (non-subscribing) members of FunTrivia may play most games on the site, such as the Easy game and the Daily game, and are able to play all user-created quizzes. However, scores are only saved for the first 100 quizzes. A free member is able to participate in the majority of hourly and daily trivia games. All players may create quizzes. Members may also join or create a team whose members all share a common similarity.

A subscription (Gold Membership) option is available for frequent players, allowing access to more activities than a free member. A Gold Member can play as many quizzes as they desire and have the quizzes recorded and receive points. Other features only for Gold Members include quiz analysis options, no ads, and faster searching. They are also able to play the Pot of Gold game, where players have to answer questions in a different topic every day.

History
FunTrivia began at the University of Waterloo as the "Archive for Useless Facts and Trivia" in 1995, a simple website that allowed visitors to submit facts and information into a database. The owner, Terry Ford, contacted Yahoo! founder Jerry Yang and the website was added under a new "trivia" category in the Yahoo directory.

With the registering of its domain in 1999, the website became FunTrivia.com, and quickly launched into other areas of quizzing.

References

American entertainment websites
Quiz games
Trivia